This is a list of ambassadors to Liechtenstein. Note that some ambassadors are responsible for more than one country while others are directly accredited to Vaduz.

Current Ambassadors to Vaduz

See also
 Foreign relations of Liechtenstein
 List of diplomatic missions of Liechtenstein
 List of diplomatic missions in Liechtenstein

References
  Diplomatic Missions to the Principality of Liechtenstein

 
Liechtenstein